Khatangi is a prominent village in Bihar, India. It is situated in Sonbhadra-Bansi-Surajpur Block in Arwal district of the State of Bihar. It is located at 96.1 km distance from Arwal and at 114 km distance from the state capital Patna. It is a very old village with a population of about 5,000 people. The literacy rate is 45.56%, comprising a female literacy rate of 27.3% and a male literacy rate of 62.98%. The people here are very friendly and hospitable. The economy of this village is agro-based and agriculture remains the main source of income.

Khatangi is a Gram Panchayat. The surrounding villages are Majhiawan (north), Sarbahada (south), Rapura (east) and Chandaukhar (west). It has two satellite sub-villages named Deva Bigaha and Mahadeo Bigaha.

Transportation 

Khatangi village is connected via road from all the four sides, viz., Gaya town through Mau and Tekari, Jehanabad town through Manikpur and Kurtha, Arwal town through Banshi and also through Kurtha and Kinjer, and Aurangabad town through Konch and Goh. Regular buses fly between Jehanabad and Khatangi and between Gaya and Khatangi. You can go anywhere around the village through auto-rickshaw. The nearest Railway Station is Jehanabad and the nearest Airport is Gaya and Patna.

Institutions 

1. SMH School, Khatangi

Saraswati Mandir High School or SMH School, Khatangi is very respected school of the region, in which over a dozen surrounding villages send their wards for study. It is situated at about 2 km east from Khatangi. It has a C-shaped building with a beautiful flower garden in the front and two big fields in the back and side. It houses 5 classes from Std. VI to Std. X with multiple sections. There are 8 - 12 well trained teachers and staffs. The school has produced several well placed, successful and renowned persons, who serve society and nation in almost every walk of life.

2. Govt. Middle School, Khatangi

Middle School, Khatangi is situated at about 1 km west from Khatangi. It has a good building with a beautiful flower garden and a playground. It houses 5 classes from Std. I to Std. V. There are 5 - 8 well-trained teachers and staff.

Presently, there is housing one squadron of anti-naxal sqad in the building of Middle School.

Hence, the school is shifted in a new building constructed at Bhind (earlier used as playground) situated at 500 m east of village.

3. Primary Health Centre, Khatangi

Primary Health Centre, Khatangi is situated at about 1 km west from Khatangi. It has a well equipped building. It houses OPD, Dressing Room, Medicine Store and Staff Quarters. There are well trained Staffs (Doctor, Dresser, Nurse etc.) in the Health Centre.

4. Post Office, Khatangi

Post Office, Khatangi is situated in the centre of the village. There are regular Post Master and Post Man in the Post Office. Telephone facility is available in the Post Office apart from Money Order and Registry services. It serves all the communication needs of the village.

Places of interest

1. Garh (Ancient Remains):

A large Garh is situated at south of the village Khatangi. Several ancient remains have been found in the excavation of the Garh by local people. It is assumed that it is the remains of some ancient colony.

2. Phulwari (Garden):

There is a big Phulwari (Garden) situated at the bank of a small river at about 500 m west of the village. Also, there is a Surya  Mandir and a small pond in the Phulwari.

3. Surya Mandir (Temple):

A very tall Surya Temple is situated in the Phulwari of Khatangi. The temple has an excellent statue of Lord Surya. Chhat Puja is celebrated here in very large scale twice every year. Thousand of surrounding villagers come here for Chhatt Puja. It attracts a large number of visitors in regular manner.

4. Bhind (Playground):

There is a big field (playground) at about 500 m west of the village. The field is popularly known as Bhind in the village. The middle school is shifted here in a newly constructed building.

5. Pokhara (Water Reservoir):

A big Pokhara is situated at south of the village. It is used for irrigation.

6. Nadi (River):

A small river is situated at east of the village. It is a rainy season river and becomes dry in summer.

7. Aahar (Water Reservoir):

A big Aahar is situated at north of the village. It is used for irrigation and fish farming.

8. Bus Stand:

A Bus Stand is situated at South - East of the village. Buses and Auto-Rikshaw used to connect this village with Gaya (through Mau and Tekari), Jehanabad (through Manikpur and Kurtha), Arwal (through Banshi and also through Kurtha and Kinjer), and Aurangabad (through Konch and Goh) for Road Communication.

References

 https://www.nic.in
 http://kushwahaabhiyantaforum.org
 https://serviceonline.bihar.gov.in

Villages in Arwal district